Fred Everest Banbury,  (27 October 1893 – 1 April 1918) was a Canadian flying ace of the First World War, officially credited with eleven aerial victories while serving in the British Royal Naval Air Service.

Early life and education
Banbury was born in Wolseley, Saskatchewan, the only son of Robert Samuel Banbury and Susannah Beatrice (née March). He was educated at schools in Wolseley and Regina before attending Victoria College in 1911–12 and University College in 1912–14. After graduating he attended Regina Normal School, and also worked as a teacher at Bredenbury, before becoming a law student at Regina. Banbury travelled to the United States to enrol at the Curtiss Flying School at Newport News, Virginia, in March 1916, qualifying with the highest marks ever gained at the school, and was awarded Aero Club of America pilot's license No. 507 on 5 June after soloing a Curtiss biplane.

Military service
Banbury then travelled to England to join the Royal Naval Air Service, being commissioned as a temporary flight sub-lieutenant on probation on 28 June 1916. After additional training he was eventually posted to France in March 1917 to serve in No. 9 (Naval) Squadron based at St. Pol. Flying a Sopwith Pup single-seat fighter Banbury gained his first aerial victory on 31 May 1917, sharing in the driving down out of control of a German two-seater reconnaissance aircraft over Ostend. The following day he drove down a Halberstadt reconnaissance aircraft solo. His squadron were then re-equipped with the Sopwith Camel fighter, and in one of these Banbury shared in the driving down of another reconnaissance aircraft off Westende on 25 July. Banbury gained three more aerial victories in September, accounting for an Albatros reconnaissance aircraft and two Albatros D.V fighters. On 1 October 1917 he was promoted to flight lieutenant, going on to gain three more victories over enemy aircraft that month. He was granted the acting rank of flight commander on 9 November, and gained his tenth victory on the 23rd.

Banbury returned to Canada on leave in December 1917, before returning to England in February 1918, and then to his unit in France in March. He gained his eleventh and final victory, sharing in the capture of a reconnaissance aircraft near Becelaere, on 26 March.

On 1 April 1918 the Royal Naval Air Service was merged with the Army's Royal Flying Corps to form the Royal Air Force, and Flight Commander Banbury of No. 9 (Naval) Squadron became Captain Banbury of No. 209 Squadron RAF. However, the same day Banbury took off in Camel "B7247" on a practice flight, but suffered a fatal heart attack in flight and crashed.

Banbury's award of the Distinguished Service Cross "in recognition of services at Dunkirk" was gazetted posthumously on 23 April 1918.

Banbury is buried in grave "III.E.5." in Hazebrouck Communal Cemetery, Nord, France. He is also memorialized in Regina, Canada.

List of aerial victories

Endnotes

References
 Shore, Christopher, et al. (1990). Above the Trenches: A Complete Record of the Fighter Aces and Units of the British Empire Air Forces, 1915–1920. Fortress Publications.  
 

1893 births
1918 deaths
People from Wolseley, Saskatchewan
University of Toronto alumni
Royal Naval Air Service personnel of World War I
Royal Air Force personnel of World War I
Canadian World War I flying aces
British military personnel killed in World War I
Aviators killed in aviation accidents or incidents in France
Canadian recipients of the Distinguished Service Cross (United Kingdom)